Annaberdi Kakabaýew served as the interior minister in the Government of Turkmenistan.

References

Year of birth missing (living people)
Living people
Interior ministers of Turkmenistan
Place of birth missing (living people)